William Lewis "Skip" Stewart (born February 9, 1968), better known as Skip Stewart, is an aerobatic and commercial pilot from the United States. Stewart flies in airshows in the United States and abroad, in his two highly modified Pitts muscle biplanes.

Early years and introduction to aviation 
Skip Stewart was born in Decatur, Alabama and was introduced to aviation by his grandfather, who worked as a crop-duster, and took Skip flying in a Piper PA-18 Super Cub and a Piper Twin Comanche. He went to his first airshow at around fourteen years of age, which is where he recalls his interest in aerobatics was born by watching the great Leo Loudenslager fly

Commercial aviation career 
Stewart attended Middle Tennessee State University, graduating with a major in Aerospace Administration (with a minor in Psychology). While in college, he acquired his Private, Commercial, Multi-engine, CFI, CFII and MEI licenses, and instructed until the summer after he graduated. He then worked for Northwest Airlink (Northeast Express), flying as a first officer for 15 months. After a brief stint towing gliders in a Maule, he flew for a UPS feeder for six months before being hired by the Southern Company, where he flew King Air, Citation II, and Citation V aircraft as captain.

Aerobatics career

Aircraft and competitive aerobatics 
Stewart had flown RC model aircraft for many years and was very familiar with aerobatics, and at age nineteen, he flew an aerobatic aircraft for the first time, a Bucker Jungmann with his friend Chris Woodward.

Stewart’s first airplane was a 1976 Pitts S-2A, which he sold in 2000 to buy a 1979 Pitts S-2S. He spent several off seasons modifying this aircraft into what would eventually become the original version of his trademark Prometheus muscle biplane. In 2011 he bought a second aircraft, another 1979 Pitts S-2S and used its airframe to build a second airshow aircraft, which he named Prometheus 2 (P2). The original Pitts is now referred to as P1.

The aircraft are highly customized in order to achieve superior aerobatic performance. Both have custom wings, tails, cowlings, engines, propellers, landing gear, instrument panels, fuel tanks and even seat belts. The only stock components on the two aircraft are the horizontal stabilizers. The engines produce 400 hp (compared to the 260 hp of the stock S-2S), and the aircraft are capable of +12 and -7 G, more than twice the G-limit of the stock variant.

Stewart is also in the process of having a completely composite-built carbon-fiber biplane designed and built for him. Called the P3 Revolution Biplane, it is scheduled to debut in 2014. He has also built a Wittman Tailwind W-10 from scratch, later selling it to buy a 1964 Twin Comanche. He also ran an aerobatic flight school for two years in Pensacola, FL by the name of “Pensacola Aerobatics”, flying his S-2A.

He also entered in several aerobatic competitions during this time, winning many Gold Medals in regional competitions. He won two Pitts Trophies (Awarded to the highest scoring Pitts pilot in any category) and was crowned the South Eastern Aerobatic Champion in the Intermediate category in 2000 (the only contest he flew in his stock Pitts S-2S)  Stewart was honored as the recipient of the 2013 Bill Barber Award for Showmanship, given to one pilot per year for demonstrating superior showmanship.  Stewart states that he was honored and humbled to receive the award, and that is the most prestigious award he has ever received.  The award recipient is voted on by previous recipients of the award.

Airshow performances 

Skip Stewart is best known for his high-energy aerobatics routine, which includes very low and slow knife-edge passes. His performances most often involve transitioning into slow knife-edge flight immediately after takeoff, followed by an outside-banked turn as he sets up for his routine. The performances themselves involve extreme positive and negative G maneuvers, utilizing the full performance and maneuvering envelopes of his aircraft. He is known for performing a double ribbon-cut, in which he slices the first (upper) ribbon with his aircraft’s vertical tail while in inverted flight, and the second (lower) ribbon with his lower wing while in sustained knife-edge flight. Stewart’s showmanship typically continues till the very end of his performances, as he lands on one wheel, and then performs smoking doughnuts on the taxiway.

Stewart holds the distinction of being the first pilot to fly under a jumping motorcycle at an airshow. He also flies knife-edge while racing cars and trucks on the runway, including the Shockwave jet truck. He has even done a ribbon transfer from the back of a pickup truck to his wing while traveling at 70 mph in knife-edge flight.

Stewart was a member of the X-Team and flew Codename Mary’s Lamb with Jim Leroy. He happened to be flying with him on the day Leroy crashed his aircraft and died. The following day, Stewart flew his Pitts biplane in a touching salute to Leroy. He continued the show by flying Tinstix of Dynamite with pilots such as Jurgis Kairys, Patty Wagstaff, Melissa Pemberton and Gary Ward. He also flies a similar show called “Mayhem” with John Mohr. In addition to utilizing jet trucks to add to the spectacle, these shows also make heavy use of synchronized pyrotechnics provided by Rich’s Incredible Pyro.

In addition to his airshow routines, Stewart makes it a point to make himself available to airshow fans and enthusiasts, and enjoys interacting with the crowd. He trains hard in order to maintain the physical fitness required to withstand the intense stress of high-G flight. Even though he jokingly refers to himself as “Piloto Loco”, he emphasizes that safety is always the first priority, and must be balanced with entertainment.

References

External links 
 Skip Stewart Airshows
 Skip Stewart Airshows 2011 promo
 Skip Stewart Airshows 2009 promo
 Skip Stewart Airshows 2007 promo

Living people
1968 births
People from Decatur, Alabama
Middle Tennessee State University alumni
Aerobatic pilots
Commercial aviators